Rajnagar Assembly constituency may refer to the following constituencies in India:
 Rajnagar, Bihar Assembly constituency
 Rajnagar, Himachal Pradesh Assembly constituency
 Rajnagar, Madhya Pradesh Assembly constituency
 Rajnagar, Tripura Assembly constituency
 Rajnagar, West Bengal Assembly constituency, former assembly constituency in West Bengal